Nobile is a lunar impact crater that is located near the southern pole of the Moon. It lies to the south of the crater Scott, along the western rim of Amundsen. Between Nobile and the southern pole lie the smaller craters Shoemaker and Faustini.

This is an eroded crater formation that is almost constantly cloaked in deep shadows. When sunlight does enter the interior of this crater, it does so at a very oblique angle. The crater rim is overlaid by several lesser craters, the most notable being a formation about half the diameter of Nobile along the western rim. There are also small craters along the southwest and northern parts of the rim. The outer rampart of Amundsen overlies the eastern rim and inner wall. The interior floor of this crater is somewhat irregular, and there are a few small craterlets across the surface.

Nobile was previously designated Scott A before being assigned a name by the IAU.

On 20 September 2021, NASA selected the western edge of Nobile as the landing site for the VIPER mission, set to arrive in November 2024.

References 

  

  

 
 
 
 
 
 
 
 
 
 

Impact craters on the Moon